The Legacy Standard Bible (LSB) is an English translation of the Bible that was released in 2021. It is an update to the New American Standard Bible Updated Edition (NASB 1995), with permission from the Lockman Foundation, as an alternative to the 2020 Revision of the NASB. The LSB was produced and edited by a team of faculty from The Master's Seminary and is published by Three Sixteen Publishing, Inc., in partnership with the Lockman Foundation and with funding from the John MacArthur Charitable Trust.

Translation philosophy 
The LSB is a direct update of the NASB 1995 edition that "honors and upholds the NASB tradition, and endeavors to more fully implement its translation philosophy." The translators of the LSB used the original Hebrew, Aramaic, and Greek sources to review every verse in the translation for accuracy. Any changes made in the LSB from the NASB 1995 were made for "greater consistency in word usage, accuracy in grammatical structure, and tightening phrasing."

The Hebrew text used for this translation was the Biblia Hebraica Stuttgartensia together with the most recent insights from lexicography, cognate languages, and the Dead Sea Scrolls. For Greek, the 27th edition of Eberhard Nestle's Novum Testamentum Graece, supplemented by the 28th edition in the General Epistles, was used as the base text while consulting the Society of Biblical Literature GNT as well as the Tyndale House GNT on variant texts. The greatest strength of the NASB was its reliability and fidelity to the original languages, and the LSB seeks to be an improvement upon it "while simultaneously preserving its faithful legacy."

YHWH 
One significant departure from the NASB 1995 is the rendering of the tetragrammaton YHWH (rendered as "Jehovah" in the original ASV). The NASB rendered it as "LORD" or "GOD" in all capitals, but the LSB renders it as "Yahweh" or "Yah" depending on the original, underlying Hebrew usage. The stated reason for this change was as follows:

Doulos 
Another significant translation in the LSB is the Greek word doulos, which the LSB always renders as "slave". This is opposed to many other modern English Bible translations that render it as "servant". The LSB translators defended this decision for consistency as follows:

Pronouns Referring to God 
One of the distinctive features of the NASB was that all pronouns referring to God were capitalized. The LSB has preserved this decision to capitalize all pronouns referring to God and, by extension, Jesus Christ and the Holy Spirit. For example, in John 3:16, the LSB says, "For God so loved the world, that He [God] gave His only begotten Son, that whoever believes in Him [God's Son, Jesus] shall not perish, but have eternal life" (emphasis added). The LSB translators explained the benefits of this decision, stating that "Capitalization aids in two main ways. First, it is a way to show honor to God who is greater than man. Second, it helps the reader track with the author, making clear exactly to whom the pronoun refers."

Translators 
The translation work was done by a group of scholars from The Master's Seminary and was sponsored by the John MacArthur Charitable Trust in partnership with the Lockman Foundation. The LSB website states that it "also went through an extensive review process from a team that consists of scholars and pastors from all around the world" and "was reviewed by a team of 70+ scholars, pastors, and every-day NASB readers... [to ensure] readers from all walks of life can easily engage and interact with the text."

References

External links 
 Official website

2021 books
2021 in Christianity
Bible translations into English